The Revised Common Lectionary (RCL) is a lectionary of readings or pericopes from the Bible for use in Christian worship, making provision for the liturgical year with its pattern of observances of festivals and seasons. It was preceded by the Common Lectionary, assembled in 1983, itself preceded by the COCU Lectionary, published in 1974 by the Consultation on Church Union (COCU). This lectionary was derived from various Protestant lectionaries in current use, which in turn were based on the 1969 Ordo Lectionum Missae, a three-year lectionary produced by the Roman Catholic Church following the reforms of the Second Vatican Council.

Origin 

The Revised Common Lectionary was the product of a collaboration between the North American Consultation on Common Texts (CCT) and the International English Language Liturgical Consultation (ELLC). After a nine-year trial period, it was publicly released in 1994. The CCT membership includes the United States Conference of Catholic Bishops and the Canadian Conference of Catholic Bishops as well as many traditionally liturgical American and Canadian Protestant churches, including Lutheran, North American Anglican (Episcopal), Presbyterian, and (more loosely) Methodist. The CCT thereby represents the majority of American and Canadian Christians and has been widely adopted in Great Britain and in other countries such as Australia. Various churches, however, have made some changes to the form of the RCL that they use. It has been further adapted for Sunday school and children's church use.

As in its predecessors, readings are prescribed for each Sunday: a passage typically from the Old Testament (including in Roman Catholic and Episcopal/Anglican Churches those books sometimes referred to as the Apocrypha or deuterocanonical books), or the Acts of the Apostles; a passage from one of the Psalms; another from either the Epistles or the Book of Revelation; and finally a passage from one of the four Gospels.

Also like its predecessors, it runs in three-year cycles; the gospel readings in the first year (Year A) are taken from the Gospel of Matthew, those in the second year (or Year B) from the Gospel of Mark, and in the third year (or Year C) come from the Gospel of Luke. Portions of the Gospel of John are read throughout Eastertide, and are also used for other liturgical seasons including Advent, Christmastide, and Lent where appropriate.

 Year A begins on the first Sunday of Advent in 2019, 2022, 2025, etc.
 Year B begins on the first Sunday of Advent in 2020, 2023, 2026, etc.
 Year C begins on the first Sunday of Advent in 2021, 2024, 2027, etc.

It differs from its Latin predecessor, however, in that—as a result of feedback collected from the participating churches during the trial period—a greater emphasis is given to Old Testament passages and to Wisdom literature.

Scripture usage 

The major principle behind the lectionary is that on a Sunday members of congregations should be able to hear the voice of each writer week by week, rather than readings being selected according to a theme. Thus, in any given year the writer of one of the first three gospels will be heard from beginning to end. Likewise the rest of the New Testament is heard, in some cases, virtually in total, in others in large part.

This principle is subject to a number of exceptions. Firstly, different principles apply during the special seasons of the year: Advent, Christmas, Epiphany, Lent, and Easter. Here appropriate lections relevant to the season are chosen. The rest of the year, called Ordinary Time, begins in February (after Candlemas) and runs until the Second Sunday before Lent. It then resumes after Pentecost until the Sunday before Advent which is kept as the Feast of Christ the King.

Secondly, because the cycle is three years long, only three of the Gospel writers are given a year. St. John's Gospel, whose form and character is very different from the three synoptic gospels is treated differently and is inserted into all three years. Thus passages from St. John appear in the special seasons of Advent and Lent, on Passion (Palm) Sunday in all three years, throughout Holy Week, including Good Friday, on Easter Day as the first alternative Gospel, during most of the Easter season, on Pentecost and during the year in which St. Mark's gospel is in use. A practical reason for this is that Mark is considerably shorter than either St. Matthew or St. Luke.

The treatment given to the Old Testament provides a further qualification to the first principle. Because it is so much longer than the New, it is inevitable that a smaller proportion of the material will be included, unless readings are to be very long. Readings are much more selective both in terms of the books included: little appears from the books of Leviticus and Numbers and almost none from 1 and 2 Chronicles. Moreover, it was decided that churches could choose between two tracks in their use of the Old Testament. "Track 1" adheres to the principle of giving the Biblical writer their own voice, thus following week by week from a portion of a book, or, in the case of some books, the whole. "Track 2", on the other hand, designated the "Related Track", is intended to relate in some way to the Gospel for the day. Provision is made for the use of a responsorial psalm each Sunday.

Lastly, there has been a certain amount of editing so that some verses of most books are omitted. Sometimes the omission is simply an introduction to a book; sometimes more substantial material has been excluded, but the overall intention, that of allowing, say, the substance of a biblical writer's thoughts to be read and heard in church, has arguably been achieved at least more substantially than before. There have been arguments over individual editorial judgements and the Church of England, in its use of the RCL, has re-inserted verses, in brackets, which were felt by its Liturgical Commission to be more properly included.

Such is the length of the Scriptural canon that no Sunday lectionary can cover the whole of Scripture without the necessity of very long readings on a Sunday or a longer cycle of years. Sometimes there has to be a choice between telling a long story or omitting it entirely. However, the daily lectionary, devised by the Roman Catholic Church and adopted by the Church of England (among others), provides more material. The CCT has also produced a volume of daily readings.

The Church of England has augmented the RCL by the provision of readings for second and third services. Thus the RCL lectionary is used for the "Principal Service", which often takes the form of a Eucharist, while allowing for additional material at other services which may be Morning and Evening Prayer (though provision is made for either being a Eucharist). Minimal changes to the "Principal Service" have been made in order to preserve its use as an ecumenical lectionary; the most significant of these is in Year B where in Epiphany for three Sundays readings from Revelation replace readings from 1 Corinthians.

Denominational practices 

The Revised Common Lectionary is used in its original or an adapted form by churches around the world. The Ordo Lectionum Missae, on which it is based, is used in the Roman Catholic Church in local translations as the standard lectionary. Various other churches have also adopted (and sometimes adapted) the RCL; some may consider its use optional. These include:

 United States
 American Baptist Churches, USA
 Church of the Nazarene
 Christian Reformed Church in North America
 Communion of Evangelical Episcopal Churches
 Communion of Reformed Evangelical Churches
 Community of Christ
 Disciples of Christ
 Episcopal Church in the United States of America
 Evangelical Lutheran Church in America
 Free Methodist Church 
 Grace Communion International
 King's Chapel, Boston, an autonomous Unitarian Universalist church in the Anglican tradition
 Lutheran Church–Missouri Synod
 Moravian Church in America
 Presbyterian Church USA
 Reformed Church in America
 United Church of Christ
 United Methodist Church
 Unitarian Universalist Christian Fellowship
 Canada
 Anglican Church of Canada
 Canadian Baptists of Western Canada
 Evangelical Lutheran Church in Canada
 Grace Communion International Canada
 Lutheran Church–Canada
 Mennonite Church Canada
 Presbyterian Church in Canada
 United Church of Canada
 United Kingdom
 Church of England
 Church of Scotland
 Church in Wales
 Methodist Church of Great Britain
 Scottish Episcopal Church
 United Reformed Church
 Philippines
 Apostolic Catholic Church
 Convention of Philippine Baptist Churches
 Episcopal Church of the Philippines
 Philippine Independent Church
 United Church of Christ in the Philippines
 United Methodist Church in the Philippines
 Australia
 Anglican Church of Australia
 Uniting Church in Australia
 Italy
 Waldensian Evangelical Church
 Italian Methodist Church
 Baptist Evangelical Christian Union of Italy (UCEBI)
 Evangelical Reformed Baptist Churches in Italy
 Hong Kong
 Evangelical Lutheran Church of Hong Kong (基督教香港信義會)
 Lutheran Church-Hong Kong Synod (香港路德會)
 Ghana
 Presbyterian Church of Ghana
 Methodist Church Ghana

See also 
Mass (liturgy)
Gospel Book

Notes

References

External links 

 Online copy at Vanderbilt University
 Online copy, organized by the calendar, maintained by The Episcopal Church
 Online copy at CBI Facoltà Battista di Teologia (Italian) (dead link, not fully archived in the Internet Archive, see )
 Church of England RCL with readings for second and third services
 New Revised Standard Version RCL passages and resources at United Church of Christ SAMUEL site
 TextWeek.com is a site that lists actual lectionary scripture assignments for several denominations.

Missals
Christian Bible
Anglican liturgical books